Elijah Motonei Manangoi (born 5 January 1993) is a Kenyan middle-distance runner. He competed in the 1500 metres at the 2015 World Championships in Athletics in Beijing winning the silver medal and at the 2017 World Championships, where he won the gold medal.

Manangoi was cited as one of the Top 100 most influential Africans by New African magazine in 2017.

International competitions

1Did not start in the semifinals

Personal bests
Outdoor
800 metres – 1:44.15 (Birmingham 2018)
1500 metres – 3:28.80 (Monaco 2017)
Indoor
1000 metres – 2:17.09 (Stockholm 2017)
1500 metres – 3:37.62 (Düsseldorf 2017)

References

External links

1993 births
Living people
Kenyan male middle-distance runners
World Athletics Championships athletes for Kenya
People from Narok County
World Athletics Championships medalists
Athletes (track and field) at the 2014 Commonwealth Games
Athletes (track and field) at the 2016 Summer Olympics
Olympic athletes of Kenya
Commonwealth Games medallists in athletics
Commonwealth Games gold medallists for Kenya
Athletes (track and field) at the 2018 Commonwealth Games
World Athletics Championships winners
African Championships in Athletics winners
IAAF Continental Cup winners
Commonwealth Games gold medallists in athletics
21st-century Kenyan people
Medallists at the 2018 Commonwealth Games